The Irish Schoolboys rugby union team is the national team for secondary school students and under-18 school players in Ireland.
There is an equivalent Ireland under 18 clubs side that play international rugby.

Role
The Irish Schoolboys side represents the nation against youths of other nations.

They provide a starting point for Ireland qualified players that has led to players representing the National Team, Ireland A, Development, Provincial, Students, Irish U-20 and AIL teams.

Currently in both the Republic and Northern Ireland there are 246 Schools playing rugby; Ulster (107), Leinster (75), Munster (41) and Connacht (23).

School competitions
Each of the four Provinces holds a Schools Cup competition every season, usually culminating in a Provincial Cup Final held on or around St Patricks Day (17 March each year). Despite the age group the qualifying games and finals are usually very well attended with crowds often better than those attending most adult club games, for Leinster Schools Cup Finals crowds of 15–20,000 are not unusual. This has brought onboard sponsors of the various competitions such as the Northern Bank Schools' Cup (Ulster), Supermacs Schools Cup (Connacht) and the Powerade Schools' Cup (Leinster).

Opposition
They also play against other 6 Nations countries' schoolboys sides during the year, and also other test playing nations schools teams on a more infrequent basis.

Recent matches include a narrow loss to France in a schoolboy Under-18 match on 20 December 2007.

Since 2011, the team has taken part in the annual European Under-18 Rugby Union Championship, winning the title in this competition in 2011. It was Ireland's fourth appearance in the final, having previously lost to France in 2007, 2008 and 2010. 2011 marked the first time that Ireland was represented by a schools team rather than a Clubs XV.

Notable former Schoolboy representatives
The following players have been called by the Ireland senior national team. The casual reader may notice that the list contains mainly Ulster & Leinster players. Contrary to popular belief, one does not have to be a Leinster player to be recognised as having exceptional rugby ability. 

Andrew Trimble
David Humphreys
Tommy Bowe
Paddy Wallace
Jacob Stockdale
Rory Best
Simon Best
Paddy Jackson
Stuart Olding
Darren Cave
Paul Marshall
Nathan Doak
Neil McMillan
Michael Lowry
James Hume
Jeremy Davidson
Iain Henderson

Gordon D'Arcy
Luke Fitzgerald
Cian Healy
Jamie Heaslip
Shane Jennings
Rob Kearney
Brian O'Driscoll
Johnny Sexton
Gavin Duffy
Andrew Dunne

Honours
 European Under-18 Rugby Union Championship
 Champions: 2011
 Runners-up: 2007, 2008, 2009, 2012, 2014

European championship

Positions
The team's final positions in the European championship:

References

External links
Irish Colleges Rugby Union
Under 18 Six Nations Festival
IRB Junior World Championship
FIRA AER U18 Euro Championship

Schoolboys
European national under-18 rugby union teams